"Spinnin' for 2012" is a song by British soul singer-songwriter Dionne Bromfield and rapper Tinchy Stryder. It was released on 23 September 2011 to Amazon and iTunes as a digital download in the United Kingdom. It is the Official Olympic Torch Relay Song for the London 2012 Olympic Games. The song appears on Bromfield's album Good for the Soul.

Background

The song is a reworked version of a Speech Debelle original, with both Stryder and Bromfield rewriting the track's lyrics. Joking about being unsuccessful in obtaining Olympic 2012 tickets, Stryder told The Sun: "I didn't get any tickets in the end, like loads of other people. I tried but had no luck. I'm hoping that this song will get us a few, though." He went on to say, "I must be in with a chance, surely. I'm desperate to see some of the events. It will be massive. I'd love to watch the men's 100m final."

Live performances
Dionne Bromfield and Tinchy Stryder performed the song live on ITV entertainment programme Born to Shine. The song was also scheduled to be performed on another ITV program Lorraine on Tuesday, 27 September 2011, but this did not proceed.

Music video
The music video was filmed in London, UK by US director Dale "Rage" Resteghini, who is also known to be the favorite music video director for Soulja Boy. The video was premiered on Dionne Bromfield's YouTube channel on Thursday, 21 July 2011, at a total length of two minutes and fifty-six seconds.

Synopsis
The video sees Tinchy Stryder and Dionne Bromfield in a black colored Mini Convertible driving around City of London and past Tower Bridge, then the scene switches to them both in a dark place, standing on a stage, where Bromfield and Stryder begin to dance on the stage surrounded by lighted torches. Bromfield is first dressed in a Union Jack decorated sleeveless shirt, before later having a change of clothing, she then proceeds to sing, with Stryder following up with pop rap rhymes over post-dubstep beats about success, he leaves out multisyllabic rhymes in this song in order to accommodate the purpose of the song.  The last scene in the video sees Bromfield in two different outfits singing in front of dancers in front of a wall, then Stryder reappears in the scene and him and Bromfield strike a pose, before dap greeting, then proceeding back to the black colored Mini Convertible and driving away.

Track listing

Release history

References

2011 songs
Dionne Bromfield songs
Tinchy Stryder songs
2012 Summer Olympics
Olympic theme songs
Music videos directed by Dale Resteghini